Alberto Sermonia Sumaya Jr. (born November 21, 1975), popularly known as Betong Sumaya, is a Filipino comedian, actor, and former production assistant for GMA Network, where he is also a part of the network's talent agency. He graduated with a Bachelor of Arts degree in Filipino and a minor in mass communication from the Polytechnic University of the Philippines.

Sumaya participated in the GMA reality show Survivor Philippines: Celebrity Doubles Showdown (2011), where he also became the eventual victor. He appears in GMA's longtime-running gag show Bubble Gang.

Television career
Betong has numerous roles as Antonietta in various GMA TV shows, CelebriTV, Celebrity Bluff and Wowowin; with Boobay and Donita Nose.

Survivor Philippines: Celebrity Doubles Showdown
Betong Sumaya was named as the second Celebrity Sole Survivor in the season, Survivor Philippines: Celebrity Doubles Showdown. The live announcement was held at the GMA Network Studio hosted by Richard Gutierrez on February 10. Betong made it to the Top 3 along with fellow castaways, Mara Yokohama and Stef Prescott.

Filmography

Television

TV specials

Film

Awards and recognitions

References

External links
 
 Sparkle GMA Artist Center profile

1975 births
Living people
People from Antipolo
Male actors from Rizal
Tagalog people
Polytechnic University of the Philippines alumni
GMA Network (company) people
GMA Integrated News and Public Affairs people
Participants in Philippine reality television series
Survivor (franchise) winners
Survivor Philippines contestants
Reality show winners
GMA Network personalities
Filipino male television actors
Winners in the Survivor franchise

Filipino male film actors
Filipino male comedians
Filipino television presenters
Filipino television variety show hosts
GMA Music artists